Linnea Pettersson (born 28 July 1995) is a Swedish handball player who plays for HSG Blomberg-Lippe in the German Handball-Bundesliga Frauen and the Swedish national team.

She also represented Sweden in the 2013 European Women's U-19 Handball Championship in Denmark, placing 8th.

She made her debut on the Swedish national team on 21 April 2021.

Achievements 
Svensk handbollselit:
Winner: 2014, 2015, 2016, 2018, 2019
Silver Medalist: 2017

References

1995 births
Living people
Swedish female handball players
People from Kiruna Municipality
IK Sävehof players
Sportspeople from Norrbotten County
21st-century Swedish women